William Walter Ward (August 8, 1903 - May 9, 1984) was a member of the Wisconsin State Assembly.

Biography
Ward was born on August 8, 1903, in St. Croix County, Wisconsin. He attended grade school in Star Prairie, Wisconsin and high school in Minneapolis, Minnesota before graduating from the University of Minnesota Law School in 1929. A Roman Catholic, he was a member of the Knights of Columbus.

Career
Ward was elected to the Assembly in 1956, 1958 and 1960. Additionally, he was City Attorney and a member of the school board of New Richmond, Wisconsin. He was a Democrat.

References

External links
The Political Graveyard

People from New Richmond, Wisconsin
Politicians from Minneapolis
Catholics from Wisconsin
Catholics from Minnesota
Democratic Party members of the Wisconsin State Assembly
20th-century American lawyers
School board members in Wisconsin
20th-century American politicians
University of Minnesota Law School alumni
1903 births
1984 deaths
Wisconsin city attorneys